This is a list of Latvian football transfers in the 2007 summer transfer window by club.

All transfers mentioned are shown in the external links at the bottom of the page. If you want to insert a transfer that isn't shown there, please add a reference.

Latvian Higher League

FK Ventspils 

In:

Out:

FHK Liepājas Metalurgs 

In:

Out:

Skonto FC 

In:

Out:

Dinaburg FC 

In:

Out:

FC Daugava 

In:

Out:

FK Jūrmala 

In:

Out:

FK Rīga 

In:

Out:

JFK Olimps 

In:

Out:

Others

FK Auda 

In:

Out:

SK Blāzma 

In:

Out:

FK Elīza 

In:

Out:

FK Flaminko 

In:

Out:

FS Metta-Latvijas Universitāte Rīga 

In:

Out:

FK Multibanka 

In:

Out:

FK Venta 

In:

Out:

FK Vindava 

In:

Out:

FK Zibens/Zemessardze 

In:

Out:

External links 
 2007 Summer Transfers on Official site of Latvian Football Federation 

2007
Latvia
Football
transfers